Nikolay Suleimanov (born  and reportedly killed December, 1994) nicknamed "Khoza" and "Ruslan", was one of the leaders of the Chechen mafia in Russia. He is also the boss of the Suleimanov clan.

Life 
Suleimanov came to Moscow in the early 1980s and helped Khozh-Ahmed Noukhaev and Movladi Atlangeriyev to set up the Chechen gangs there. By 1986, his group controlled Moscow's Southern River Port, the largest car market in the capital, and specialized in racketeering the "New Russian" class. Following a turf war in 1988–89, the Chechen alliance, nominally controlled by Musa the Older, managed to force some of the top rival criminal organizations completely out of the city and assume the dominant position in Moscow. In 1990, he was sentenced to four years in prison, but was released two years later.<ref>Vadim Volkov, 'Violent Entrepreneurs: The Use of Force in the Making of Russian Capitalism, p.32</ref>

In 1993, he went with his men to Chechnya, where he was joined by the charismatic gangster-turned-militant Ruslan Labazanov and took part in a coup attempt against the Chechen President Dzhokhar Dudayev, demanding his resignation. After having been seriously wounded during a demonstration-turned-shootout in the center of Grozny and taken into Dudayev's government custody, Sulejmanov left the separatist republic and returned to Moscow.

"Khoza" was reportedly killed in December 1994, shortly before the outbreak of First Chechen War, shot dead at one of his businesses, the 7th Car Service Station in Moscow, by a contract killer sent by the Russian mafia. His position was taken over by "Aslan" and "Lechi the Beard". It was one of the series of high-profile gangland murders that marked the beginning of another turn of major mafiya'' bloodletting in 1995–1996.

References 

1955 births
1994 deaths
Assassinated Chechen people
Chechen gangsters
Deaths by firearm in Russia
Russian crime bosses
Murdered Russian gangsters
People murdered in Russia
Russian people of Chechen descent

*****